Rani Jagadamba Kumari Devi(1918-1988) was the wife of Lt.-Gen.Madan Shumsher JBR, daughter-in-law of Maharaja Prime Minister Chandra Shumsher JBR. Jagadamba Kumari Devi was born in Balrampur district, Uttar Pradesh.  After marriage with Lt.-Gen.Madan Shumsher JBR she moved to Kathmandu and lived in Shree Durbar.

She is credited for building numerous temples, public water sprouts and Jagadamba Nepali Dharmashala (free lodging) at sacred sites outside Nepal. At prominent religious places like Rameswaram in Tamil Nadu, Varanasi  and many more. Rani Jagadamba Kumari Devi established Nepali Schools and Scholarship programs in Varanasi for Nepali students through Vidya Dharma Pracharini Nepali Samiti of Varanasi.
She also gave many endowments to educational Institutions both in India and Nepal. In 1956, on memory of her husband late General Madan Shumsher JBR She established Madan Puraskar Pustakalaya and started the award, through establishing the Madan Puraskar Guthi (Fund) for awarding famous writers .
After her death in 1989, another award Jagadamba Shree Purasakar was established by Madan Puraskar Pustakalaya in the honor of Rani Jagadamba Kumari Devi to Nepalis contributing in Nepali Language, Literature, Art and Folk Culture Field. She also established Jagadamba Databya Aushadhalaya (charitable dispensary) and Madan Dhara Samiti for charitable work. She also donated 22 ropani land of Shree Durbar to Sajha Yatayat's services and for the overall public good.

Honours 
 Member of the Order of Gorkha Dakshina Bahu

Gallery

See also
Jagadamba Shree Purasakar
Madan Puraskar
Madan Puraskar Pustakalaya
Shri Durbar

References

1989 deaths
People from Balrampur district
1918 births
20th-century Indian philanthropists